Akaoni Studio S.L. is a Spanish video game developer and publishing company founded in 2009 in Valencia, Spain.

Its first success, Zombie Panic in Wonderland, has turned Akaoni Studio into one of the first Spanish businesses to publish in Japan by making them number one in sales for WiiWare in the country.

In 2010, Akaoni's studio head, Jose Manuel Iñiguez, was one of the judges present on DSidea.

List of developed videogames

List of published videogames

References

External links
Official Akaoni Studio's website
Official Akaoni Studio's twitter account
Official Marvelous Entertainment's website
Official Arc System Works' Japanese website
Official Marvelous Entertainment's Japanese Zombie Panic in Wonderland website
Official Arc System Works' Japanese Zombie Panic in Wonderland website

Video game companies established in 2009
Video game companies of Spain
Video game development companies
Video game publishers
Spanish companies established in 2009
Companies based in Valencia